St. Mary of the Annunciation Catholic Church is a Catholic church in Charleston, South Carolina, and was the first Catholic parish established in the Carolinas and Georgia. The current building at 93 Hasell Street and is the third structure to house the congregation on this site.

History 
The property and an old building were purchased in 1789. It was incorporated as the Catholic church in Charleston by the South Carolina General Assembly in 1791. The first structure was replaced by a brick church that burned in the Charleston fire in 1838.

The church was rebuilt quickly and reopened on June 9, 1839. It is a rectangular building, 84 ft (25.6 m) by 50 ft (15.2 m). It is built of brick with a stucco covering. There are four Doric columns that support a large entablature. The parapet wall at the top of the church was probably constructed around 1896. There are stained glass windows imported from Munich.

The nave has a central aisle and two large rows of pews. There are smaller pews along the side aisles. Above the altar, there is a painting of the Crucifixion by John S. Cogdell. The artist donated this painting to replace an earlier painting he had done in 1814, which was destroyed in the fire. Much of the interior of the church was renovated during a three-month renovation in 1884. The church graveyard is on each side and to the rear of the church.

In the early 1980s, the neighboring Charleston Place complex was constructed, bordering the church on all sides. It was the only structure preserved on the lot, besides the few storefronts facing Meeting Street which were incorporated in the parking structure.

The St. Mary's Church is on the National Register of Historic Places, No. 76001697. The South Carolina Department of Archives and History has additional pictures and information. and copies of the nomination forms. There are additional pictures and information available from the Historic American Buildings Survey at the Library of Congress.

References

External links

Saint Mary's website
Historic Charleston's Religious and Community Buildings, a National Park Service Discover Our Shared Heritage Travel Itinerary

Churches on the National Register of Historic Places in South Carolina
Churches in Charleston, South Carolina
Roman Catholic churches in South Carolina
National Register of Historic Places in Charleston, South Carolina
Roman Catholic churches completed in 1839